is a railway station in Karatsu, Saga Prefecture, Japan. It is operated by JR Kyushu and is on the Chikuhi Line.

Lines
Rapid and local services on the Chikuhi Line stop at this station.

Station layout
The station consists of two side platforms two tracks with a siding. The station building is a timber structure of traditional design and houses a waiting room and a staffed ticket window. Access to the opposite side platform is by means of a footbridge. A bike shed is provided outside.

Management of the station has been outsourced to the JR Kyushu Tetsudou Eigyou Co., a wholly owned subsidiary of JR Kyushu specialising in station services. It staffs the ticket counter which is equipped with a POS machine but does not have a Midori no Madoguchi facility.

Adjacent stations

History
When the Kitakyushu Railway was nationalized on 1 October 1937, Japanese Government Railways (JGR) took over control of the station and designated the line which served it as the Chikuhi Line. With the privatization of Japanese National Railways (JNR), the successor of JGR, on 1 April 1987, control of the station passed to JR Kyushu.

Passenger statistics
In fiscal 2016, the station was used by an average of 609 passengers daily (boarding passengers only), and it ranked 220th  among the busiest stations of JR Kyushu.

Environs
Karatsu City Hamatama Branch Office
Hamasaki Post Office

See also
 List of railway stations in Japan

References

External links
Hamasaki Station (JR Kyushu)

Railway stations in Japan opened in 1924
Chikuhi Line
Railway stations in Saga Prefecture
Stations of Kyushu Railway Company